The sacral spinal nerve 2 (S2) is a spinal nerve of the sacral segment.

It originates from the spinal column from below the 2nd body of the sacrum

Muscles
S2 supplies many muscles, either directly or through nerves originating from S2. They are not innervated with S2 as single origin, but partly by S2 and partly by other spinal nerves. They are most commonly known to govern the toes. The muscles are:
 sphincter urethrae membranaceae
 gluteus maximus muscle 
 piriformis
 obturator internus muscle 
 superior gemellus
 semitendinosus
 gastrocnemius
 flexor hallucis longus
 abductor digiti minimi
 quadratus plantae

Additional Images

References

Spinal nerves